The 2023 BC Lions season is scheduled to be the 65th season for the team in the Canadian Football League (CFL) and their 69th overall. The Lions will attempt to qualify for the playoffs for the second straight year and win their seventh Grey Cup championship.

The 2023 CFL season is scheduled to be the third season with Rick Campbell as the team's head coach and the second season with Campbell and Neil McEvoy as co-general managers.

Offseason

CFL Global Draft
The 2023 CFL Global Draft is scheduled to take place on May 2, 2023. If the same format as the 2022 CFL Global Draft is used, the Lions will have three selections in the draft with the seventh-best odds to win the weighted draft lottery.

CFL National Draft
The 2023 CFL Draft is scheduled to take place on May 2, 2023. The Lions currently have seven selections in the eight-round draft after trading away their first-round pick for Vernon Adams and their third-round pick for Terry Williams, but re-acquired a first-round pick from the Toronto Argonauts after trading Jordan Williams.

Aside from their traded picks, the Lions are scheduled to have the seventh selection in each of the eight rounds of the draft after losing the West Final and finishing second in the 2022 league standings.

Preseason

Schedule

Regular season

Standings

Schedule

Team

Roster

Coaching staff

References

External links
 

BC Lions seasons
BC Lions
BC Lions season